Richard Edwin "Rich" Saeger (born March 4, 1964) is an American former competition swimmer, Olympic gold medalist, and former world record-holder.  At the 1984 Summer Olympics in Los Angeles, Saeger earned a gold medal by swimming for the winning U.S. team in the final of the men's 4×200-meter freestyle relay.  The American team of Geoff Gaberino, David Larson, Bruce Hayes and Saeger set a new world record in the Olympic preliminary heat (7:18.87), only for the Americans to break the record again in the event final later on the same day.

See also
 List of Olympic medalists in swimming (men)
 List of Southern Methodist University people
 List of World Aquatics Championships medalists in swimming (men)
 World record progression 4 × 200 metres freestyle relay

References

Bibliography 

 De George, Matthew, Pooling Talent: Swimming's Greatest Teams, Rowman & Littlefield, Lanham, Maryland (2014).  .

1964 births
Living people
American male freestyle swimmers
World record setters in swimming
Olympic gold medalists for the United States in swimming
Sportspeople from Rochester, New York
SMU Mustangs men's swimmers
Swimmers at the 1983 Pan American Games
Swimmers at the 1984 Summer Olympics
World Aquatics Championships medalists in swimming
Medalists at the 1984 Summer Olympics
Pan American Games gold medalists for the United States
Pan American Games medalists in swimming
Universiade medalists in swimming
Universiade silver medalists for the United States
Medalists at the 1983 Summer Universiade
Medalists at the 1983 Pan American Games